The 1832 Maine gubernatorial election took place on September 10, 1832. Incumbent Democratic Governor Samuel E. Smith defeated National Republican candidate Daniel Goodenow in a re-match of the previous year's election.

Results

References 

Gubernatorial
Maine
1832
September 1832 events